The Victorian Railways Y class was a class of 0-6-0 steam locomotives. 

The Y class was an example of the new policy of standard design principles being adopted by the railways of the time. The original pattern locomotive (an 0-6-0 tender engine) was built by Kitson & Co. at Leeds in England in 1885, and was exhibited, along with E426, in 1888 at the Melbourne Centennial Exhibition, held in the Melbourne Exhibition Building. The other 30 locomotives of this type were built by the Phoenix Foundry at Ballarat in 1888-1889. They were given road numbers 383 to 441 (odd numbers only), and the pattern engine 445, 443 having been allotted to an "Old" R class. They were big locomotives for their time—in fact the largest and most powerful 0-6-0s to run in Australia. The class excelled in their performance and acceptance by crews. They were often seen on suburban passenger trains prior to electrification, finishing their lives as yard shunters. Withdrawal of the Y class began in 1926, and only 20 were still in service when renumbered in 1940. The last in regular service was No. 108 which was withdrawn in 1963 after being a pilot engine at North Melbourne for many years.

Y109 (originally Y413) was taken off the register 23 December 1954 and frame and wheels sold to the Brunswick Plaster Mills Pty. Ltd, which rebuilt it into a diesel-mechanical locomotive, to work the Millewa South Railway from Nowingi to Raak Plain in north-western Victoria. It carried the number Y413 for some of the time it operated in that form.

Preservation
Y108 is on static display at the Newport Railway Museum.

Y109/Y413 was acquired by Steamrail Victoria in the 1980s and moved to Ballarat East Locomotive Depot, where parts were used in the restoration of Y112. The remains were acquired by the Australian Railway Historical Society and donated to the Millewa Pioneer Park at Meringur in 2008.

Y112 was withdrawn from service in 1961 and was preserved on a plinth outside the Ballarat railway station. It was purchased by the Ballarat Historical Society and is now owned by Ballarat's Sovereign Hill Museum. The locomotive was leased to Steamrail Victoria and restored to operational condition with the help of West Coast Railway. It was returned to service in 1996 and operates occasional rail tours.

Gallery

References

External links
 Victorian Preserved Steam Locomotives detailed information about all surviving ex-VR steam locos
 VICSIG Y Class Information on the Y class
 Y class drawing
 Y class photo
 Side view
 Y 397

Y class
0-6-0 locomotives
Railway locomotives introduced in 1885
Kitson locomotives
Broad gauge locomotives in Australia